Lyrodus is a genus of ship-worms, marine bivalve molluscs of the family Teredinidae.

Species in the genus Lyrodus
 Lyrodus affinis (Deshayes, 1863)
 Lyrodus auresleporis Munari, 1975
 Lyrodus bipartitus (Jeffreys, 1860) – furrow shipworm
 Lyrodus dicroa (Roch, 1929)
 Lyrodus floridanus (Bartsch, 1922) – Florida shipworm
 Lyrodus massa (Lamy, 1923)
 Lyrodus medilobatus (Edmondson, 1942)
 Lyrodus mersinensis Borges & Merckelbach, 2018
 Lyrodus pedicellatus (de Quatrefages, 1849) – blacktip shipworm
 Lyrodus takanoshimensis (Roch, 1929) – Takanoshima shipworm
 Lyrodus turnerae MacIntosh, 2012
Species brought into synonymy
 Lyrodus tristis (Iredale, 1936): synonym of Lyrodus pedicellatus (Quatrefages, 1849)

References

 Coan, E. V.; Valentich-Scott, P. (2012). Bivalve seashells of tropical West America. Marine bivalve mollusks from Baja California to northern Peru. 2 vols, 1258 pp.

External links
 Gould A.A. (1870). Report on the Invertebrata of Massachusetts. Second edition, comprising the Mollusca. Edited by W.G. Binney. Boston. 524 pp, textfigs 350-754, colored pis 16-27 comprising figs 214-349
  Dall, W. H., Bartsch, P. & Rehder, H. A. (1938). A manual of the Recent and fossil marine pelecypod mollusks of the Hawaiian Islands. Bulletin of the Bernice P. Bishop Museum. 153: 1-233, 58 pls
 Bartsch, P. (1921). A new classification of the shipworms and descriptions of some new wood boring mollusks. Proceedings of the Biological Society of Washington. 34: 25-32
 Turner, R. D. (1966). A Survey and Illustrated Catalogue of Teredinidae (Mollusca: Bivalvia). Museum of Comparative Zoology, Cambridge (Massachusetts). ix + 265 pp.
 
 Powell A. W. B., New Zealand Mollusca, William Collins Publishers Ltd, Auckland, New Zealand 1979 

Teredinidae
Bivalve genera

fr:Nucula